Dry Fork is a stream in Moniteau County in the U.S. state of Missouri. It is a tributary of North Moreau Creek.

The stream flows to the east-southeast passing under US Route 50 and continues for approximately six miles to its confluence with North Moreau Creek about four miles west of California.

Dry Fork was so named as its streambed is typically dry.

References

Rivers of Moniteau County, Missouri
Rivers of Missouri